The NATO C-band is the obsolete designation given to the radio frequencies from 500 to 1000 MHz (equivalent to wavelengths between 0.6 and 0.3 m) during the cold war period. Since 1992 frequency allocations, allotment and assignments are in line to NATO Joint Civil/Military Frequency Agreement (NJFA).
However, in order to identify military radio spectrum requirements, e.g. for crises management planning, training, electronic warfare activities, or in military operations, this system is still in use.

References

External links 
 The VSAT Installation Manual Video Presentation shows examples of the arrangement of the Feed for c-band polarization requirements
 VSAT Installation Manual with explanation of c-band polarization requirements for a VSAT

Microwave bands